The 31st Combat Communications Squadron (31 CBCS) was a United States Air Force combat communications squadron, located at Tinker AFB.

Mission

History
Lineage.  Constituted as 31 Communications Squadron, Command and activated on 7 Dec 1959.  Organized on 1 Feb 1960.  Inactivated on 1 Oct 1970.  Disbanded on 15 Jun 1983.  Reconstituted and redesignated as 31 Combat Communications Squadron on 15 Jul 1988.  Activated on 22 Jul 1988.
Assignments.  Strategic Air Command, 7 Dec 1959; 1 Communications (later 1 Aerospace Communications) Group, Command, 1 Feb 1960-1 Oct 1970.  3 Combat Communications Group, 22 Jul 1988-.
Stations.  Offutt AFB, NE, 1 Feb 1960-1 Oct 1970.  Tinker AFB, OK, 22 Jul 1988-.

Assignments

Major Command
Air Force Space Command (???- ???)

Wing/Group
 3d Combat Communications Group (???-Present)

Previous designations
 31st Combat Communications Squadron (???-Present)

Bases stationed
Tinker AFB, Oklahoma (???-Present)

Commanders

Lt. Col. William Uhrig (2009-2012)
Lt. Co.  Jeffery Katzman (2012-2013)
Capt. Christopher Abbot (2013-Closure)

Decorations
Air Force Outstanding Unit Award

References

External links
Tinker AFB, Oklahoma

031
Combat Communications 0031